Sundolyra latebrosa is a species of catfish found in Sumatra. This species occurs the Kreung Babah Rot drainage in northwestern Sumatra. This species is the only known member of its genus.

References

Bagridae
Fish described in 2015